is a retired Japanese admiral who served as the 5th Chief of Staff, Joint Staff of the Japan Self-Defense Forces from 2014 to 2019, and was the longest-serving person in that position. Prior to his appointment, he was the Chief of Staff of the Japan Maritime Self-Defense Force, the de facto navy of Japan.

Career
Katsutoshi Kawano was born in  Hakodate, Hokkaido
on November 28, 1954, the son of  
Japan Maritime Self-Defense Force Rear Admiral Katsuji Kawano.(His father was the Commanding Officer of Sub Area Activity Hakodate.)
His father participated in World War II as a young officer of the Imperial Japanese Navy.
He aspired to be an naval officer under the influence of his father.
Then when his father retired, he raised in Ibaraki, Osaka.

He attended the National Defense Academy of Japan, graduating in 1977 with a degree in mechanical engineering. He then joined the Japan Maritime Self-Defense Force, serving in a number of command and staff positions.

In 1991, then-Commander Kawano took command of the JS Oyodo, DE-231, an Abukuma-class destroyer escort. In 1999, then-Captain Kawano took command of MSDF Escort Flotilla 3. In 2004, then-Rear Admiral Kawano took command of the MSDF Sasebo District. In 2008, Kawano took command of the Mine Warfare Force.  His career was temporarily in jeopardy when a ship under his command, the JDS Atago (DDG-177), collided with a fishing boat and caused two fishermen to go missing. In 2010, then-Vice Admiral Kawano became the Vice Chief of Staff of the Joint Staff Council. One year later, in 2011, he became the 45th Commander of the Self-Defense Fleet, succeeding Kenichi Kuramoto. In 2012, he was succeeded by Yasushi Matsushita.

On 26 July 2012, Kawano was promoted to full Admiral and became Chief of Staff of the MSDF, replacing outgoing admiral Masahiko Sugimoto. As MSDF Chief of Staff, he was deeply involved in the ongoing Senkaku Islands dispute.

On 14 October 2014, Admiral Kawano was named by then-Prime Minister Shinzo Abe as the Chief of Staff, Joint Staff of the Japan Self Defense Forces (JSDF). As the Chief of Staff, Joint Staff, his term as the is extended thrice, making him serve his post beyond his retirement age at 62. His term was extended first in November 2016, and was extended for a whole year through May 27, due to the North Korea Tensions and his close ties with Shinzō Abe, and got his term extended again until March 31, 2019, as he was replaced by Kōji Yamazaki.

After retirement, he became an advisor to the Ministry of Defense.  
Currently, he is a commentator for the Nippon TV group and an advisor for several companies.

Awards and honors
 – Order of Abdulaziz Al Saud (Saudi Arabia)
  – Legion of Merit (Officer and Commander)
 - Honorary Officer of the Order of Australia (Military Division)

Defensive memorial cordons
  2nd Defensive Memorial Cordon
  3rd Defensive Memorial Cordon
  11th Defensive Memorial Cordon
  17th Defensive Memorial Cordon
  18th Defensive Memorial Cordon 
  19th Defensive Memorial Cordon 
  20th Defensive Memorial Cordon 
  21st Defensive Memorial Cordon
  22nd Defensive Memorial Cordon
  25th Defensive Memorial Cordon 
  26th Defensive Memorial Cordon with 2 gold cherry blossoms 
  32nd Defensive Memorial Cordon
  33rd Defensive Memorial Cordon
  36th Defensive memorial cordon 
  37th Defensive Memorial Cordon 
  38th Defensive Memorial Cordon 
  40th Defensive Memorial Cordon 
  41st Defensive Memorial Cordon

Dates of promotion

References

External links

Living people
Chiefs of Staff of the Japan Maritime Self-Defense Force
1954 births
Military personnel from Kanagawa Prefecture
National Defense Academy of Japan alumni